Eupithecia rufescens is a moth in the family Geometridae. It is found in Japan.

References

Moths described in 1878
rufescens
Moths of Japan